Akhumzi Jezile (15 January 1989 – 28 April 2018) born in Ngcobo, was a South African actor, television presenter and producer. He is best known for being a presenter on the SABC 1 television show, YOTV and an actor in the SABC 1 drama series Tempy Pushas and as "Ngulube" in Themby Phishers.
In 2014, he won the SAFTA award for Best Supporting Actor in a TV Drama for this role.

He died in a car accident together with Siyasanga Kobese and other two friends, between Maletswai and Komani on his way to Ngcobo to bury his grandmother.

Early life
He was born 12 January 1989 and raised in Eastern Cape, Mthatha later on his family has moved to live in Johannesburg. Akhumuzi is the first born in a family of five children. His father died when he was still a young boy and he raised by his mother, Zoleka Jezile. He attended Winile Secondary School located in Katlehong .

Career 
From 2016-2018, he was the host of SABC 1 show Fan Base season 5.

Awards and nominations
He received the Golden Horn Award for being the best supporting actor in Tempy Pushas in 2013.

Personal life
He was in a relationship with Kelly Khumalo up until his death in 2018. This story is, however, unconfirmed.

Death
Akhumuzi died in a car crash with his three friends including Thobani Mseleni and Siyasanga Kobese in Aliwal North near Komani. He was laid to rest in West Park Cemetery at Johannesburg

References

External links

1989 births
2018 deaths
South African male actors
People from Engcobo Local Municipality
Burials at Westpark Cemetery
Road incident deaths in South Africa